is a Japanese actress, gravure idol, and TV personality from Tokyo. Since 2009, she has used the stage name .

In the level Graniny Gorki Lab of the PlayStation 2 video game Metal Gear Solid 3: Snake Eater, there is a poster of Haruna Yabuki.

Filmography

Film
 The Incredible Truth (2013)
 Space Sheriff Sharivan: NEXT Generation (2014)
 Tokyo Tribe (2014)
 Twisted Justice (2016)

TV series
 Tokumei Kakaricho Tadano Hitoshi (TV Asahi, 2003)
 Vampire Host (TV Tokyo, 2004)
 Engine (Fuji, 2005)
 Shimokita Glory Days (TV Tokyo, 2006)
 Uranaishi Tenjin (CBC, 2006)
 Seishun Energy Dandori Musume (Fuji TV, 2006)
 Bishōjo Celebrity Panchanne (TV Tokyo, 2007)
 Shinjuku Swan (TV Asahi, 2007)
 Kuroi Taiyo '07 Special (TV Asahi, 2007)
 Kimi Hannin Janai yo ne? (TV Asahi, 2008, ep7)
 Yume o Kanaeru zo (YTV, 2008)
 Koi no Kara Sawagi Drama Special Love Stories V (NTV, 2008)

See also
 List of Japanese gravure idols

References

External links
 Personal blog 

1984 births
Japanese gravure models
Japanese idols
Japanese female adult models
Japanese radio personalities
Japanese television personalities
Japanese actresses
Living people